Some Will, Some Won't is a 1970 British comedy film directed by Duncan Wood, a remake of Laughter in Paradise (1951). It starred an ensemble British cast which included Michael Hordern, Ronnie Corbett, Dennis Price, Leslie Phillips and Arthur Lowe. In Henry Russell's will, four family members are left £150,000 on condition they do the bizarre tasks Russell has set out for them.

Plot
In his will, eccentric practical joker Henry Russell leaves his four relatives £150,000 each, but with stipulations designed to make each of them step completely out of character, and prove themselves as human beings. Bossy Agnes Russell must work as a maid for a month, Herbert must overcome his natural shyness and rob a bank, woman chasing bachelor Simon has to marry the first single woman he speaks to, and crime writer Denniston is asked to commit a crime and be sent to jail for a month. When the four individuals report back to the executor, their lives are transformed for the better. But Henry still has one more surprise up his sleeve.

Cast

 Ronnie Corbett as Herbert Russell
 Thora Hird as Agnes Russell
 Michael Hordern as Denniston Russell
 Barbara Murray as Lucille Grayson
 Leslie Phillips as Simon Russell
 Wilfrid Brambell as Henry Russell
 Dennis Price as Benson
 James Robertson Justice as Sir Charles Robson
 Sheila Steafel as Sheila Wilcott
 Eleanor Summerfield as Elizabeth Robson
 Arthur Lowe as Police Sergeant
 Harold Goodwin as Williams
 Noel Howlett as Endicott - Solicitor
 Diana King as Mrs. Craik
 Stephen Lewis  as Police Constable Arthur
 Norman Mitchell as Policeman
 John Nettleton as Wagstaff
 Brian Oulton as Mr. Dale
 Frank Thornton as Hotel Manager
  David Lander as Ricci	
 Claire Davenport as Blowzy Woman	
 Robin Tolhurst as Lettie	
 Vicki Woolf as Janine

Production and reception
Laughter in Paradise (1951) was produced by Mario Zampi and edited by his son, Giulio, who took the same role as his father on this film. An early release of Nat Cohen's Anglo-EMI, it carried over from the production schedule of the earlier Associated British Picture Corporation (ABPC), the studio which had made the original film.

David Parkinson, a reviewer for the Radio Times, comments: "Some people really will find this comic calamity funny, but they'll be in a very small minority." While "Laughter in Paradise was a patchy, but thoroughly amiable slice of whimsy", Parkinson believes "this insipid remake" is "not only an insult to the memory of the original, but it also breaches the Trades Descriptions Act" if it is intended to be a comedy and wastes a good cast.

References

External links
 

1970 films
1970 comedy films
British comedy films
Films shot at Associated British Studios
Films set in London
Films scored by Howard Blake
1970s English-language films
1970s British films